Zhongwei Shapotou Airport  is an airport serving the city of Zhongwei in Ningxia Hui Autonomous Region, China. The airport cost 370 million yuan to build and started operation on 26 December 2008. It was originally called Zhongwei Xiangshan Airport (中卫香山机场), but adopted the current name in August 2012 to promote the local tourist attraction Shapotou.

Airlines and destinations

See also
List of airports in China
List of the busiest airports in China

References

External links
China West Airport Group

Airports in Ningxia
Airports established in 2008
2008 establishments in China